Poliopastea vittata is a moth of the family Erebidae. It was described by Francis Walker in 1854. It is found in Pará, Brazil.

References

Poliopastea
Moths described in 1854